The Atlantic 10 Conference Men's Basketball Player of the Year is a basketball award given to the Atlantic 10 Conference's (A–10) most outstanding player. The award was first given following the conference's inaugural 1976–77 season, when the conference was officially known as the Eastern Collegiate Basketball League but popularly known as the Eastern 8. David West of Xavier is the only player to have won the award three times (2001–2003). Four other players (James Bailey, Earl Belcher, Greg Jones and Steven Smith) have won the award twice. Three players have also won the award in the same season that they were named the Naismith College Player of the Year or received the John R. Wooden Award, the nation's two most prestigious men's college basketball awards (Marcus Camby in 1996, Jameer Nelson in 2004, and Obi Toppin in 2020).

As of 2023, Temple has the most all-time winners with 10, but the Owls left for the American Athletic Conference in July 2013. Among schools remaining in the conference beyond 2013, Saint Joseph's and UMass have the most winners, with five each. There have been three ties in the award's history (1983, 2005, 2018). Three current member schools have had no winners—Fordham, George Mason, and the league's newest member Loyola Chicago, which is playing its first A-10 season in 2022–23.

Key

Winners

Winners by school

Footnotes

References

NCAA Division I men's basketball conference players of the year
Player of the Year
Awards established in 1977